The 1977 Uganda National League was the tenth season of the Ugandan football championship, the top-level football league of Uganda.

Overview
The 1977 Uganda National League was contested by 13 teams and was won by Kampala City Council FC, while Gangama were relegated.

Express FC defeated the Army side Simba FC 2-0 in a crucial league match but were subsequently banned for allegedly being involving in anti-government activities, by the Governor of the Central Province, Col. Abdallah Nasur, who was unhappy about his side's loss.  In 1979 the ban was lifted after the regime of Idi Amin had ended.

League standings

Leading goalscorer
The top goalscorer in the 1977 season was Denis Obua of Uganda Police FC with 24 goals.

References

External links
 Uganda - List of Champions - RSSSF (Hans Schöggl)
 Ugandan Football League Tables - League321.com

Ugandan Super League seasons
Uganda
Uganda
1